Halboun or Halbun is a Syrian village in the Al-Tall District of the Rif Dimashq Governorate. According to the Syria Central Bureau of Statistics (CBS), Halboun had a population of 6,521 in the 2004 census. Its inhabitants are predominantly Sunni Muslims.

History
Halboun which was mentioned as Chalybon by Ptolemy and Strabo, was famous for its fine wine, in which it was considered as a luxury to the Persian kings in the Eber-Nari satrapy of the Achaemenid Empire.

There are several Roman ruins found in Halboun, most famously the inscriptions which date back to the reign of Herod Agrippa II.

References

Bibliography

Populated places in Al-Tall District